Molala (Molele, Molalla) is the extinct and poorly attested Plateau Penutian language of the Molala people of Oregon and Washington. It is first attested along the Deschutes River, and later moved to the Molalla and Santiam rivers, and to the headwaters of the Umpqua and Rogue rivers. It was once thought to be close to Cayuse.

Dialects
There were three known dialects:

Northern Molala, spoken in southern Oregon in the Cascade Range
Upper Santiam Molala, spoken along the upper Santiam River in the Cascades in central Oregon.
Southern Molala, spoken in southern Oregon in the Cascade Range

Phonology 
The phonology of the Molala language:

Consonants

Vowels 

/i/ and /a/ can also shift to /ə/.

Grammar
Molala is a verb-heavy polysynthetic language.

Case
Molala nouns have seven cases: nominative, accusative, genitive, instrumental, locative, allative, and ablative.

References

External links 

Molale (Molalla)
OLAC resources in and about the Molale language

Indigenous languages of Oregon
Extinct languages of North America
Indigenous languages of the North American Plateau
Plateau Penutian languages
Languages extinct in the 1950s
1958 disestablishments in the United States
Language isolates of North America